SR-8278 is an experimental drug that was developed as an antagonist of Rev-ErbAα. It has been used to demonstrate potential applications of Rev-ErbAα antagonists in the treatment of conditions such as Duchenne muscular dystrophy and Alzheimer's disease.

See also 
 GSK4112
 SR9009
 SR9011

References 

Isoquinolines